Reverie is a Mini-LP by Rafael Anton Irisarri, pressed by American label Immune (distributed by Thrill Jockey). It was released worldwide as 12" vinyl on April 20, 2010. It contains two original compositions and a 14-minute rendition of Arvo Pärt's tintinnabuli masterpiece Für Alina.

Track listing 
All tracks written, arranged, and produced by Rafael Anton Irisarri, except "Für Alina" (composed by Arvo Pärt)

 "Lit a Dawn"
 "Embraced"
 "Für Alina"

Personnel 
 Rafael Anton Irisarri — Production, mixing; piano, bowed guitar, electronic and non-conventional instruments
 Kelly Wyse - Piano on Für Alina
 Andreas Tilliander - Mastering
 Paco Barba — Artwork design
 Nicola Colonna — Photography

References 

2010 albums